Following is a list of transhumanists.

A

 Steve Aoki
 Henri Atlan
 Jacques Attali

B

 Ronald Bailey
 William Sims Bainbridge
 Hal V. Barron
 Greg Bear
 Alim Louis Benabid
 Russell Blackford
 Nick Bostrom
 Marshall Brain
 David Brin
 Damien Broderick
 Vitalik Buterin

C

 Riccardo Campa
 Tim Cannon
 Jamais Cascio
 Pierre Teilhard de Chardin
 George M. Church
 José Luis Cordeiro
 Brian Cox (physicist)
 Lee Daniel Crocker
 Antonei Csoka

D

 Jeff Dee
 Manel De Aguas
 K. Eric Drexler
 George Dvorsky

E

 Alexandra Elbakyan
 Warren Ellis
 Robert Ettinger

F

 Luc Ferry
 Hal Finney (computer scientist)
 FM-2030
 Robert Freitas
 Jacque Fresco
 Patri Friedman
 Steve Fuller (sociologist)
 Nikolai Fyodorovich Fyodorov

G

 Hugo de Garis
 Joel Garreau
 Linda MacDonald Glenn
 David Gobel
 Ben Goertzel
 Aubrey de Grey
 CGP Grey

H

 Yuval Noah Harari
 Brian Hanley (microbiologist)
 Robin Hanson
 Donna Haraway
 Neil Harbisson
 Stephen Hawking
 Keith Henson
 Danny Hillis
 James Hughes (sociologist)

I

 Zoltan Istvan
 Dmitry Itskov

J

 Bryan Johnson (entrepreneur)

K

 Dean Kamen
 Michio Kaku
 Maria Konovalenko
 Randal A. Koene
 Ray Kurzweil
 Marios Kyriazis

L

 Jaron Lanier
 Anthony Levandowski
 Arthur D. Levinson
 Newton Lee

M

 Ken MacLeod
 Steve Mann
 Danila Medvedev
 Andy Miah
 Marvin Minsky
 Hans Moravec
 Max More

N

 Ramez Naam
 Yuri Nikitin (author)

O

P

 Liz Parrish
 David Pearce (philosopher)
 Hank Pellissier
 Charles Platt (author)
 Giulio Prisco
 Barry Ptolemy

Q

R

 Moon Ribas
 Glenn Reynolds
 Gabriel Rothblatt
 Martine Rothblatt

S

 Anders Sandberg
 Jason Silva
 R. U. Sirius
 Victor Skumin
 Stefan Lorenz Sorgner
 Peter Sloterdijk
 Stelarc
 Bruce Sterling
 Gregory Stock
 Gennady Stolyarov II
 Charles Stross
 Masayoshi Son

T

 Jaan Tallinn
 Astro Teller
 Peter Thiel
 Alvin Toffler
 Aaron Traywick

U

 Tim Urban (blogger)

V

 Giuseppe Vatinno
 Vernor Vinge
 Natasha Vita-More

W

 Mark Alan Walker
 Kevin Warwick
 Ben Westbrook
 Stephen Wolfram
 David Wood (futurist)
 Naomi Wu

X

Y

 Eliezer Yudkowsky

Z

See also 

 Humanism

 List of humanists